CF99 was a Welsh language politics programme on S4C named after the unique post code of the National Assembly for Wales from where the programme was broadcast live. The programme was presented by Bethan Rhys Roberts and Vaughan Roderick. It was launched on 3 October 2007 and was last broadcast in July 2013. A replacement programme O’r Senedd was launched in 2015.

References

External links 
 

S4C original programming
Television shows set in Cardiff